This is a list of regents in the modern Kingdom of Greece (1832–1924 and 1935–1973). A regent, from the Latin regens "one who reigns", is a person selected to act as head of state (ruling or not) because the ruler is a minor, not present, or debilitated.

Reign of Otto

Following their marriage in 1836, during Otto's illnesses and absences from the capital, Queen Amalia undertook the duties of a regent.

Reign of George I

Reign of Alexander

First reign of George II

Second reign of George II

Reign of Paul

Reign of Constantine II

See also
Regency
List of regents
List of heads of state of Greece
President of Greece
Prime Minister of Greece
Monarchy of Greece

Notes and references 

Greece
Greece
Heads of state of Greece
Regents
Regents